New Reform Magazine is a music magazine (fanzine) based in Southern California. They are distributed in and throughout Los Angeles, California, Orange County, California, Reno, Nevada, Seattle, Washington, Seattle, Washington, and beyond. Their major competitor is Skratch Magazine.

Bands Featured 
The Loved Ones (American band)
Rise Against
Anti-Flag
Lucero (band)
Death Cab for Cutie
Koufax (band)
The Ponys (band)
Blake Schwarzenbach

References

External links
 New Reform Magazine Website

Magazines published in California
Magazines with year of establishment missing
Online music magazines published in the United States
Zines